Walenty Żebrowski (died 15 May 1765 in Kalisz) was a notable 18th-century Polish painter and a member of the Bernardine order.

It has been documented that Walenty Żebrowski was a native of Lubawa and that his given name at birth was Antoni. However, as was common in the era, the specific year, or even decade, of his birth remained unrecorded. Nearly two-and-a-half centuries after his death in Kalisz, he is remembered as the creative artist behind a series of late-baroque polychromes in Bernardine churches in Poznań, Warsaw, Warta, Skępe, Ostrołęka and Kalisz.

References
 

People from Lubawa
18th-century Polish–Lithuanian painters
18th-century male artists
Polish male painters
Polish Cistercians
1765 deaths
Year of birth unknown